The Montgomery Wings were a professional baseball team that represented Montgomery, Alabama in the independent All-American Association and Southeastern League from 2001 to 2003.

External links
Baseball Reference

Baseball teams established in 2001
Baseball teams disestablished in 2003
2001 establishments in Alabama
2003 disestablishments in Alabama
Professional baseball teams in Alabama
Defunct Southeastern League teams
Defunct All-American Association teams
Sports in Montgomery, Alabama
Defunct independent baseball league teams
Southeastern League teams
Defunct baseball teams in Alabama